This is a time line of the 1991 Soviet coup d'état attempt, starting from the house arresting of Mikhail Gorbachev and  ending in the  surrender of the failed coup leaders.

Timeline

References

Russian history timelines
Dissolution of the Soviet Union
Attempted coups in the Soviet Union
1991 Soviet coup d'état attempt